Actinidia polygama (also known as , silver vine, and cat powder) is a species of kiwifruit in the Actinidiaceae family.

These colorful markings make the plant identifiable from afar, until the flowering season when the leaves turn completely green.

The longevity of an individual flower is 2–3 days, when the plant also starts to develop small, yellow to yellow-red, egg-shaped, fleshy, and multiseeded fruits, which mature from September to October. The inside of the fruit resembles the common kiwifruit, but it is orange in color rather than green.

The silver vine plant requires moist, well-drained soil, and partial shade to full sun. This fast-growing vine makes for good cover on a fence or trellis. It is becoming increasingly popular as an edible fruit crop.

Uses

Traditional medicine
In traditional Chinese and Japanese medicine, it has been used for a wide range of health problems, including:

In Korean Buddhism, silver vine was soaked in traditional Korean sauces and used for diuresis, alleviation of pain, hypertension, genital troubles , and bronchitis.

It is said that "In the ancient times, weary travelers regain energy to continue their journey after eating the fruit of silver vine."

Silver vine leaves also have a high content of flavonoids, terpenoids, saponins, beta-carotene, vitamin C and vitamin E.

Culinary
The fruit in the "acorn" shape can be salted and eaten raw, fried in oil, added to rice, or mixed with sesame seeds and mayonnaise to top salads. The fruit may also be fermented to make Matatabi sake and miso; fermented into a fruit wine; or extracted for  juice. The leaves, buds, and stems can also be ground into a powder or cut, steamed, and steeped to make tea.  Adding mint or sugar can give variations in the tea.

Products
Grinding the leaves and stems into a coarser grind than needed for the tea makes Matatabi grass, which is used as bath salts.  The vine is used as material for folk crafts, and the sap is collected to make lotions.

Pets 

Silver vine has long been known to elicit euphoric response in cats. The reaction to silver vine is similar to the catnip response, but appears to be more intense. Silver vine is an alternative to catnip, and many cats that don't react to catnip will respond positively to silver vine powder made from dried fruit galls. Typical behaviors include rolling, chin and cheek rubbing, drooling, and licking. The effect usually lasts between 5 and 30 minutes, but afterwards cats are typically unresponsive to the plant for an hour or more during the refractory period.

A study published in January 2021 suggests that felines are specifically attracted to the iridoids nepetalactol and nepetalactone, present in silver vine and catnip, respectively. The compounds were found to repel mosquitos, and it is hypothesized that rubbing against the plants provides the cats with a chemical coat that protects them against mosquito bites.

References

External links 
 

polygama
Cat attractants
Flora of China
Flora of Japan
Flora of Korea
Flora of Primorsky Krai
Fruits originating in East Asia
Japanese fruit
Plants used in traditional Chinese medicine